= Aleh High School for Arts and Sciences =

Israeli high school

Aleh High School for Arts and Sciences , known as "Aleh Lod", is a high school for arts and sciences located in Lod, Israel.

The school was established in 1994 by Edward D. and Anna Mitchell. It offers several majors such as physics, biology, chemistry, computer science, Arabic and ecology. The school runs special programs together with Tel Aviv University and the Weizmann Institute of Science in their regular curriculum and honors track.
